Helmut Radach (born 1 February 1915, date of death unknown) was a German rower who competed in the 1936 Summer Olympics.

In 1936 he won the bronze medal as crew member of the German boat in the men's eight competition.

References

1915 births
Year of death missing
Olympic rowers of Germany
Rowers at the 1936 Summer Olympics
Olympic bronze medalists for Germany
Olympic medalists in rowing
German male rowers
Medalists at the 1936 Summer Olympics
Rowers from Berlin